Church of Our Lady of Light may refer to:

 Church of Our Lady of Light, Chennai, India
 Church of Our Lady of Light (Lagoa), Portugal
 Church of Our Lady of Light (Lisbon), Portugal
 Loon Church, Nuestra Señora de la Luz Parish Church (also Our Lady of Light Parish Church), Bohol, Philippines